Mwambutsa I Mbariza was the king of Burundi from 1767 to 1796. His only son was Ntare IV Rutaganzwa Rugamba. He succeeded Mwami Mutaga III Senyamwiza Mutamo.

18th-century births
1790s deaths
Burundian kings
18th-century monarchs in Africa